The following article presents a summary of the 2015–16 football season in Croatia, which will be the 25th season of competitive football in the country.

National teams

Croatia

Croatia U21

Croatia U19

Croatia U17

Croatia Women's

League tables

Croatian First Football League

Croatian Second Football League

Croatian clubs in Europe

Summary

Dinamo Zagreb

Rijeka

Hajduk Split

Lokomotiva

ŽNK Osijek

Dinamo Zagreb U19 

Match originally finished 2–0 in favour of Dinamo Zagreb, but was awarded by UEFA as 3–0 win for Anderlecht due to Dinamo Zagreb fielding suspended player Matija Fintić.

References